Pizzo Arera is a mountain of the Bergamasque Prealps of northern Italy.

Geography 
It is part of the ridge that divides Val Seriana from Val Brembana. The town of Roncobello is nearby. Fossils can be found on some ridges.
It is the largest in a group of four mountains that surround Zambla Alta. The residents of the area around the mountain are often bilingual, speaking Italian and Bergamasque.

SOIUSA classification 
According to the SOIUSA (International Standardized Mountain Subdivision of the Alps) the mountain can be classified in the following way:
 main part = Eastern Alps
 major sector = Southern Limestone Alps
 section = Bergamasque Alps and Prealps
 subsection = Bergamasque Prealps
 supergroup = Prealpi Bergamasche Centrali
 group = Gruppo Arera-Menna
 subgroup = Gruppo dell'Arera
 code = II/C-29.II-B.5.a

Geology 
Arera is composed mainly of Mesozoic sedimentary rocks, most of them limestones.

Flora 
Alpine regions have a high rate of endemism and a high diversity of plant species. This taxonomic diversity can be attributed to geographical isolation, glaciation, microhabitat differentiation.

Galium montis-arerae, the Pizzo Arera bedstraw, is a rare plant species in the Rubiaceae. It is named after the mountain, locus classicus where it was first described.

References

Mountains of the Alps
Mountains of Lombardy